The following is a list of North Indian Ocean tropical cyclones from 1910 to 1919. Records from before the 1970s were extremely unreliable, and storms that stayed at sea were often only reported by ship reports.

1910
April 13–16, 1910 – A intense tropical existed over Andaman Sea.
April 1911 - A cyclonic storm struck Teknaf in Bangladesh (then East Pakistan), causing 120,000 deaths.
May 1917 - A cyclonic storm struck the Sunderbans in Bangladesh (then East Pakistan), causing 70,000 deaths.
September 1919 - A cyclonic storm struck Barisal in Bangladesh, causing 40,000 deaths.

See also
 1910s Australian region cyclone seasons
 1900–1940 South Pacific cyclone seasons
 1900–1950 South-West Indian Ocean cyclone seasons
Atlantic hurricane seasons: 1910, 1911, 1912, 1913, 1914, 1915, 1916, 1917, 1918, 1919
Eastern Pacific hurricane seasons: 1910, 1911, 1912, 1913, 1914, 1915, 1916, 1917, 1918, 1919
Western Pacific typhoon seasons: 1910, 1911, 1912, 1913, 1934, 1915, 1916, 1917, 1918, 1919

References

North Indian Ocean cyclone seasons
North Indian Ocean cyclone